Mereghetti is a surname of Italian origin. Notable people with the surname include: 

 Mario Mereghetti (born 1938), Italian footballer
 Paolo Mereghetti (born 1949), Italian film critic

See also
 Meneghetti

Italian-language surnames